Ron Wilke (17 January 1927 – 5 March 2015) was a South African sprinter. He competed in the men's 4 × 400 metres relay at the 1952 Summer Olympics.

References

External links
 

1927 births
2015 deaths
Athletes (track and field) at the 1952 Summer Olympics
South African male sprinters
South African male hurdlers
Olympic athletes of South Africa
Sportspeople from Johannesburg